João Pedro Thomaz Pereira (March 1905 – 27 June 1984) was an Olympic freestyle swimmer from Brazil, who participated at one Summer Olympics for his native country. He was born in São Paulo.

At the 1932 Summer Olympics in Los Angeles, he swam the 100-metre freestyle, not reaching the finals.

References

External links 
 

1905 births
1984 deaths
Brazilian male freestyle swimmers
Swimmers at the 1932 Summer Olympics
Olympic swimmers of Brazil
Swimmers from São Paulo